Heirtzler Ice Piedmont is a relatively low, triangular-shaped, ice-covered area of about  extent, located at the west side of Violante Inlet and north of Maury Glacier, on the Black Coast of Palmer Land, Antarctica. The feature was first seen and photographed from the air by the United States Antarctic Service on December 30, 1940, and was mapped by the United States Geological Survey from U.S. Navy aerial photographs taken 1966–69. In association with the names of continental drift scientists grouped in this area, it was named by the Advisory Committee on Antarctic Names after James R. Heirtzler, an American physicist. Heirtzler was a Research Scientist at Columbia University's Lamont–Doherty Geological Observatory, 1960–64, and Senior Research Scientist, 1964–67; he was Senior Scientist at the Woods Hole Oceanographic Institute, 1969–86; Geophysicist and Head of the Geophysics Branch at the NASA Goddard Space Flight Center from 1986.

References

Ice piedmonts of Palmer Land